The National Kaiser Wilhelm Monument (Kaiser-Wilhelm-Nationaldenkmal) was a memorial structure in Berlin dedicated to Wilhelm I, first Emperor of Imperial Germany. It stood in front of the Berlin Palace from 1897 to 1950, when both structures were demolished by the German Democratic Republic (GDR) government.

The monument featured an imposing equestrian statue of Emperor Wilhelm I. The memorial was built in front of the Eosander portal on the west side of the Berlin Palace. The design of the memorial was commissioned by Wilhelm I's grandson, Kaiser Wilhelm II, in the Baroque Revival style and cast by the sculptor Reinhold Begas, who had also designed the Siegesallee and the Bismarck Memorial in Tiergarten.

The planned Monument to Freedom and Unity is to be located on the base originally constructed for the monument.

Competitions and the intervention of the Emperor

After the death of Wilhelm I in the Year of Three Emperors (1888) an open competition for the establishment of a national monument in his memory was tendered the next year. The first competition, in which the architect Bruno Schmitz with the draft "Imperial Forum" was chosen, did not bring the desired results. So in 1891 a second, limited bid to only eight selected artists was tendered. The construction base of the monument was laid down on the west side of the City Palace, along the Spree Canal. The design of Reinhold Begas and Gustav Halmhuber was eventually chosen.

When it became known that the Emperor desired to have one of his favorite artists, Reinhold Begas, added to the list of the original eight artists invited to submit designs for the second competition, four of the artists withdrew. As might be expected, Begas won the competition and contracted sculptor Wilhelm von Rümann and his students to assist with creating the statues for the memorial design. The architectural part of the design was devised by the Stuttgart architect Gustav Halmhuber, who won the competition with his collaborator Begas, even against the design submitted by favored court architect Ernst von Ihne.

In June 1894, construction began with the demolition of the houses that lined the street between the canal and Eosander Portal of the Berlin Palace. On August 18, 1895, the 25th anniversary of the Battle of Gravelotte, the foundation stone for the memorial was laid.  During a ten-day centennial celebration held for the 100th anniversary of Wilhelm I's birth, the monument was inaugurated on the late Emperor's birthday, 22 March 1897. The construction cost was four million marks, and represented a considerable sum when compared with the soon to be built Old Town Hall, which cost only seven million marks to construct.

Description of the memorial design

The focal point of the  monument was the  equestrian statue of the Emperor, to the left accompanied by a female representation of Peace holding the reins of his horse. The orientation of the equestrian statue was directly facing the Eosander portal (Portal III), which was the main entrance of the Berlin Palace. This followed a similar pattern of older statues around the palace, such as the monument of the Great Elector on the Elector Bridge which was aligned to face toward the palace's Portal I; and the monument to Wilhelm I's father, King Frederick William III in the Lustgarten, which was aligned with the palace's Portal IV.

Around the equestrian statue's bronze pedestal, at the corners floated four Goddesses of Victory on balls. The front the pedestal bore the inscription "William the Great, German Emperor, King of Prussia 1861-1888" and on the back was the inscription "in gratitude and true love, the German people." On the granite steps of the substructure on the north was a colossal statue of War and to the south one of Peace, created by Eugen Boermel. On the four projecting corners were four guardian lion statues. From the north, the rear part of the monument was the Spree Canal. There is a still preserved today the jetty, which was used for barges on the canal. Except for some ventilation shafts are no other entrances from the jetty to the vault under-structure of the monument.

The design was mockingly known by the nickname Wilhelm in the lions' den. This alluded to the compositional appeal of the central figure in a semicircle, which was similar to Briton Rivière recent painting Daniel's Answer to the King.

The entire memorial complex stood on a raised base of polished red granite from Sweden. This raised platform was nine steps up from the sidewalk and was suitable for national celebrations of all kinds.

The equestrian statue was enclosed on three sides facing away from the palace by a sandstone hall formed by coupled Ionic columns, which were enclosed at the ends by two corner pavilions. To emphasize the terraced rise of the square even more, the hall was increased in height by four meters. In the open and light design of the hall, only the corner pavilions were formed in a massive style. This allowed a good view on all sides of the equestrian statue and the palace beyond. The floor of the hall was covered by a sandstone mosaic floor.

On the ledge of the front four groups of figures embodied the Kingdoms of Prussia (by Peter Breuer), Bavaria (by August Gaul), Saxony (by August Kraus) and Württemberg (by Peter Christian Breuer). The four groups on the back against the Spree represented trade and shipping (by Ludwig Cauer), art (by Hermann Hidding), science (by Karl Begas) and agriculture and industriousness (by Ludwig Cauer). The southern corner pavilion was crowned by the bronze quadriga of Bavaria, the work of Karl Hans Bernewitz. The counterpart on the northern corner pavilion, the four horse quadriga representing Borussia, created by John Goetz.

History until removal

During the November Revolution of 1918, the monument was damaged in parts. During the early days of the Weimar Republic the government decided to restore the monument instead of removing it. The monument came through The Second World War relatively undamaged. In the winter of 1949/50, the GDR's ruling party, the SED decided to demolish the monument to its base. The demolition was politically motivated, as was the case a short time later with the decision to demolish the City Palace. The base still exists today on the southwestern edge of the castle square and is a listed building. The base floor is partially decorated with mosaics that are now protected under a layer of asphalt from the elements.

In the underground vaults of the pedestal, street artists are known to leave their works, which can be visited at irregular intervals at one's own risk on descending a steep ladder into a revision shaft.

From the actual monument, the four lions survived and now are on display outside the lion house at the Berlin Zoo. Furthermore, one remaining eagle statue by August Gaul is now owned by the Mark Brandenburg Museum.

References

External links 

Buildings and structures in Berlin
Former buildings and structures in Germany
Monuments and memorials to Emperor William I
Demolished buildings and structures in Berlin
1897 establishments in Germany
1950 disestablishments in Germany